The Evangelische Hochschule für Kirchenmusik Halle (Saale) is a university, specialised in music, in Halle an der Saale. 

It was established as the Evangelischen Kirchenmusikschule on 18 April 1926 by the consistory of the Evangelical Church of the Church Province of Saxony in Aschersleben.

In 1993, the Evangelischen Kirchenmusikschule was granted the status of a university, and renamed. In 2001, it moved to the Händelkarree (Kleine Ulrichstraße 35). The now located in the immediate vicinity of the musicological institute of the University of Halle, the Halle music library and the Handel House.

Directors 
 1926–1936 Julius Bürger, organist at the St.-Stephani-Kirche, Aschersleben
 1936–1939 Bernhard Henking, cantor of Magdeburg Cathedral
 1939–1951 Kurt Fiebig
 1951–1965 Eberhard Wenzel
 1965–1977 Walter Bruhns
 1977–1978 Ursula Hermann (provisional management)
 1978–1999 Helmut Gleim
 2000–2017 Wolfgang Kupke
 2017–present Peter Kopp

References

External links 
 

Reformed universities and colleges
1926 establishments in Germany
Halle (Saale)